NGEN or Ngen or variant, may refer to:

 Ngen, spirits of nature of the Mapuche beliefs. 
 Ngen language (Santo), a language found on Vanuatu
 Ngen language (Mande), a language found in the Ivory Coast
 Native Image Generator (NGen) of the  .NET Framework
 NGEN Radio, Christian music radio station in Humble, Texas, USA
 Next Generation Enterprise Network (NGEN), U.S. Navy's project to create the NMCI, Navy Marine Corps Intranet

See also
 Ingen (disambiguation)
 Engine (disambiguation)